Family Album is an American sitcom television series created by David Crane and Marta Kauffman, that aired on CBS from September 24 until November 12, 1993.

Premise
Jonathan and Denise Lerner and their three children move from California to Philadelphia to be closer to their relatives.

Cast
Peter Scolari as Dr. Jonathan Lerner
Pamela Reed as Denise Lerner
Ashlee Levitch as Nikki Lerner
Doris Belack as Lillian Lerner
Christopher Miranda as Jeffrey Lerner
Phillip Van Dyke as Max Lerner
Alan North as Dr. Sid Lerner
Rhoda Gemignani as Ruby DeMattis
Nancy Cassaro as Sheila DeMattis
Giovanni Ribisi as Elvis DeMattis

Episodes

References

External links

1993 American television series debuts
1993 American television series endings
1990s American sitcoms
English-language television shows
CBS original programming
Television shows set in Philadelphia
Television series by Warner Bros. Television Studios
Television series created by David Crane (producer)
Television series created by Marta Kauffman